Heinz A. Staab (26 March 1926 – 29 July 2012) was a German chemist. From 1990 to 1996 he was Präsident der Max Planck Society.

Biography
Staab was born in 1926 in Darmstadt. He studied chemistry at the Marburg, the Tübingen and medicine in Heidelberg. Hans Meerwein, Rolf Huisgen, Adolf Butenandt and Georg Wittig were among his academic teachers. In 1962 he was appointed professor for organic chemistry at the Ruprecht-Karls-Universität Heidelberg. Staab worked in the field of heterocyclic chemistry. Staab was the president of the German Chemical Society (GDCh) from 1984 till 1985.  He was director of the Max Planck Society from 1984 until 1990. From 1990 to 1996 he was Präsident der Max Planck Society.

Staab died on 29 July 2012 at the age of 86 in Berlin.

Awards
He has been awarded honorary professorship by the Indian Institute of Science and Academia Sinica. In 1996 he was awarded the Harnack Medal.

References

Max Planck Society people
1926 births
2012 deaths
20th-century German chemists
Scientists from Darmstadt
Members of the European Academy of Sciences and Arts
Knights Commander of the Order of Merit of the Federal Republic of Germany
Recipients of the Order of Merit of Baden-Württemberg
Presidents of the German Chemical Society
Max Planck Institute directors